Joseph Cropsey (New York, August 27, 1919 – Washington, D.C., July 1, 2012) was an American political philosopher and professor emeritus of political science at the University of Chicago, where he was also associate director of the John M. Olin Center for Inquiry into the Theory and Practice of Democracy.

Biography
Cropsey was a student of Leo Strauss, who inspired him to move from his original academic field—economic thought—to a much more theoretical approach to political thought. Since then, Cropsey had focused on Plato and the "esoteric", interstitial philosophical aspects of the theories developed by such thinkers as Adam Smith and Karl Marx.

His son, Seth Cropsey (a graduate of St. John's College), is an American neoconservative analyst for the Hudson Institute, where he is the Director for the Center for American Seapower.

Bibliography
 Joseph Cropsey (ed.), Ancients and Moderns: Essays on the Tradition of Political Philosophy in Honor of Leo Strauss, New York, Basic Books, 1964 
 Joseph Cropsey, Political Philosophy and the Issues of Politics, Chicago & London, University of Chicago Press, 1977 
 Joseph Cropsey, Plato's World: Man's Place in the Cosmos (1995), Chicago & London, University of Chicago Press, 1997 
 Joseph Cropsey, Polity and Economy: An Interpretation of the Principles of Adam Smith (With Further Thoughts on the Principles of Adam Smith), Chicago, St. Augustine's Press, 2001 (Revised Edition) 
 Thomas Hobbes (edited by Joseph Cropsey), A Dialogue between a Philosopher and a Student of the Common Laws of England (written between 1668 and 1675), Chicago & London, University of Chicago Press, 1997 
 Leo Strauss, Joseph Cropsey (eds.), History of Political Philosophy (First Edition: 1963), Chicago & London, University of Chicago Press, 1987 
 Joseph Cropsey, On Humanity's Intensive Introspection, South Bend, IN, St. Augustine's Press, 2012

See also
 American philosophy
 List of American philosophers

References

External links
 

1919 births
2012 deaths
20th-century American philosophers
21st-century American philosophers
American political philosophers
Historians of political thought
University of Chicago faculty
Writers from New York City